Ashleigh Jerise Shim (born 11 November 1993) is a Jamaican footballer who plays as a forward for the Jamaica national team. She also holds British citizenship of the Cayman Islands.

College career
Shim played as a forward with FIU Panthers during 2011–2014. During her time there, she scored 17 goals and made 13 assists.

Club career
In 2016, Shim played for VfL Sindelfingen and FC Djursholm.

International career
Shim, who is of Caymanian descent through her grandmother, represented Cayman Islands at the 2009 Caribbean Football Union Women's Under-17 Tournament.

Shim switched allegiance to Jamaica in 2015 and competed at the 2016 CONCACAF Women's Olympic Qualifying Championship qualification and the 2018 CONCACAF Women's Championship qualification. Shim made her debut with the Jamaica national team on August 25, 2015, versus the Dominican Republic.

Shim was selected for Jamaica's 2019 FIFA Women's World Cup squad. She never made her World Cup debut. Shim retired in September 2019 with an announcement made via her Instagram story.

International goals
Scores and results list Jamaica's goal tally first

Honors

References

1993 births
Living people
Sportspeople from Kingston, Jamaica
Jamaican women's footballers
Women's association football forwards
FIU Panthers women's soccer players
2. Frauen-Bundesliga players
Jamaica women's international footballers
2019 FIFA Women's World Cup players
Jamaican expatriate women's footballers
Jamaican expatriate sportspeople in the United States
Expatriate women's soccer players in the United States
Jamaican expatriate sportspeople in Germany
Expatriate women's footballers in Germany
Jamaican expatriate sportspeople in Sweden
Expatriate women's footballers in Sweden
Jamaican people of Caymanian descent
Citizens of the United Kingdom through descent
Caymanian women's footballers
Caymanian expatriate women's footballers
Caymanian expatriate sportspeople in the United States
Caymanian expatriate sportspeople in Germany
Caymanian expatriate sportspeople in Sweden
Caymanian people of Jamaican descent
British sportspeople of Jamaican descent